Joel Stoffer is an American actor. He is known for his role as Enoch on the television show Agents of S.H.I.E.L.D. (2017–2020), and has also appeared in films such as Indiana Jones and the Kingdom of the Crystal Skull (2008) and The One (2001).

Filmography

Film

Television

Video games

Music videos

References

External links

Year of birth missing (living people)
Living people
American male film actors
American male television actors
American male stage actors
American scenic designers
Place of birth missing (living people)